Jaime de Magalhães Lima (15 October 1859 in Aveiro – 26 February 1936) was a Portuguese philosopher, poet and writer.

Works
1886 - Estudos sobre a literatura contemporânea 
1887 - O Snr. Oliveira Martins e o seu projecto de lei sobre o fomento rural
1888 - A democracia  
1888 - A arte de estudar 
1889 - Cidades e paisagens 
1892 - As doutrinas do Conde Leão Tolstoi 
1894-1895 - Jesus Cristo 
1899 - Notas de um provinciano
1899 - Transviado  
1899 - O Crédito agrícola em Portugal 
1900 - Elogio de Edmundo de Magalhães Machado
1901 - Sonho de Perfeição 
1902 - J. P. Oliveira Martins 
1902 - Vozes do meu lar 
1903 - Na paz do senhor 
1904 - Reino da saudade 
1905 - Via redentora
1906 - Apóstolos da terra
1908 - S. Francisco de Assis e seus evangelhos
1909 - O ensino de Jesus : uma exposição simples 
1909 - A anexação da Bósnia e da Herzegovina pela Áustria 
1909 - José Estêvão  
1910 - Alexandre Herculano
1910 - Rogações de eremita 
1912 - O Vegetarismo e a Moralidade das raças
1915 - Salmos do prisioneiro 
1915 - A guerra : depoimentos de hereges 
1918 - Do que o fogo não queima 
1920 - Rasto de sonhos : arte e alentos de pousadas da minha terra
1920 - Eucaliptos e acácias 
1923 - Coro dos coveiros
1923 - A língua portuguesa e os seus mistérios
1924 - Alberto Sampaio e o significado dos seus estudos na interpretação da história nacional 
1925 - Camilo e a renovação do sentimento nacional na sua época 
1925 - Rafael Bordalo Pinheiro: moralizador político e social 
1926 - A arte de repousar e o seu poder na constituição mental e moral dos trabalhadores
1931 - Princípios e deveres elementares
1931 - Dificuldades étnicas e históricas da insinuação do nacionalismo na arte portuguesa contemporânea
1933 - O amor das nossas coisas : e alguns que bem o serviram
1934 - Dr. Alberto Souto : o seu espírito, o seu carácter e a sua obra
1957 - Divagações de um terceiro
1964 - O culto da flor e os jardins da Inglaterra
1968 - Os povos do baixo Vouga
1986 - Entre pastores e nas serras

External links
 
 

1859 births
1936 deaths
People from Aveiro, Portugal
19th-century Portuguese poets
20th-century Portuguese poets
Historians of vegetarianism
Portuguese philosophers
Portuguese male poets

Tolstoyans
Vegetarianism activists